is a city located in Yamagata Prefecture, Japan. , the city had an estimated population of 61,947 in 22392 households, and a population density of 550 persons per km2.

Geography
Tendō is located in the east-central portion of the Yamagata Basin, bordered by the Ōu Mountains to the east.

Neighboring municipalities
Yamagata Prefecture
Yamagata
Higashine
Sagae
Nakayama
Kahoku

Climate
Tendō has a Humid continental climate (Köppen climate classification Cfa) with large seasonal temperature differences, with warm to hot (and often humid) summers and cold (sometimes severely cold) winters. Precipitation is significant throughout the year, but is heaviest from August to October. The average annual temperature in Tendō is 11.1 °C. The average annual rainfall is 1381 mm with September as the wettest month. The temperatures are highest on average in August, at around 24.8 °C, and lowest in January, at around -1.4 °C.

Demographics
Per Japanese census data, the population of Tendō has remained relatively stable in recent decades.

History
During the Edo period, the area of present-day Tendō was part of Tendō Domain, a 20,000 koku feudal domain under the Tokugawa shogunate controlled by the Oda clan, who ruled from 1831 to 1871.
 
After the start of the Meiji period, the area organized as Tendō Village under Higashimurayama District, Yamagata Prefecture in 1878. It was elevated to town status on April 27, 1892 and became a city on October 1, 1958.

Government
Tendō has a mayor-council form of government with a directly elected mayor and a unicameral city legislature of 22 members. The city contributes two members to the Yamagata Prefectural Assembly.  In terms of national politics, the city is part of Yamagata District 1 of the lower house of the Diet of Japan.

Economy
The economy of Tendō is based on seasonal tourism, agriculture and wood products. The city is traditionally known for its production of the wooden pieces (koma) used in Japanese chess (shogi), and games of "human shogi" have been played since 1966. The city also has numerous onsen hot springs within its borders.

Education
Uyō-Gakuen College
 Tendō has twelve public elementary schools and four public middle schools operated by the city government and one public high school operated by the Yamagata Prefectural Board of Education. There is als one private high school.

Transportation

Railway
 East Japan Railway Company - Yamagata Shinkansen
 
 East Japan Railway Company - Ōu Main Line
 -  -  -

Highways
  – Tendō Interchange

Twin towns – sister cities

Tendō is twinned with:
 Marlborough, New Zealand (1989)
 Marostica, Italy (1993)
 Wafangdian, China (2002)

Notable people
Kenta Kurihara, professional baseball player
Chiyako Sato, musician

References

External links

Official Website 

 
Cities in Yamagata Prefecture